SRH Presents: Lose Your Illusions, Vol. 1 is the first (non official) compilation album by Suburban Noize Records released under Interscope Records on October 6, 1998. This album includes popular names under Interscope, such as the Kottonmouth Kings, Limp Bizkit, and Pennywise along with many others.

Track listing

References

1998 compilation albums
Suburban Noize Records compilation albums
Rapcore compilation albums
Ska compilation albums
Alternative rock compilation albums
Punk rock compilation albums